The Honourable Justice (R) Amanullah Abbasi (4 April 1935 – 15 August 2013), Barrister-at-Law, is one of the most respected names of Pakistani judiciary. He was a chairman of the Federal Service Tribunal, Islamabad. Justice (r) Amanullah Abbasi, chairman of the tribunal, retired on January 31, 2005.

In a rich tributes paid to Justice Amanullah Abbasi, Chief Justice of Sindh High Court (SHC) Justice Mushir Alam said that the late Justice Amanullah Abbasi was honest, dedicated and fearless judge, who provided justice to the people without any discrimination.

Speaking at a memorial reference organized by the Sindh Madressatul Islam (SMI) University in the memory of late Justice Amanullah Abbasi, he said that he had learnt a lot from him while working with him in judiciary.

“I consider him as one of my great teachers,” the Chief Justice commented, saying, “I think a teacher never dies instead he lives in the hearts and minds of his students, and this is why I feel that Justice Amanullah Abbasi is alive and lives in our hearts and minds.”

References

External links 
 Report Daily Kawish (Sindhi)

1935 births
Place of birth missing
Pakistani human rights activists
20th-century Pakistani judges
Lawyers from Karachi
2013 deaths
Judges of the Sindh High Court